Smolik or Smolík is a Slavic surname that may refer to:

Andrzej Smolik (born 1970), Polish musician, composer, and music producer 
František Smolík (1891–1972), Czech film actor
Jan Smolík (born 1942), Czech cyclist
Ladislav Smolík (1909–?), Czech Olympic rower

Slavic-language surnames